San Quentin (Spanish: San Quintín, meaning "St. Quentin") is a small unincorporated community in Marin County, California, United States.

Description 

San Quentin is adjacent to San Quentin State Prison, located just east of the prison, it is also known as San Quentin Village or Point San Quentin Village.  It has 40 single-family houses and a condominium complex with ten units, and its population is about 100.

The town was originally housing for the prison's employees and their families. Residents rent their driveways to media vans during controversial executions.  The reporters are attracted to the place because it is the only place in California where prisoners are executed and many death penalty abolitionists appear and demonstrate against the practice. This garners much media attention.

Government and infrastructure 

The United States Postal Service operates the San Quentin Post Office. A post office operated at San Quentin for a time in 1859, and from 1862. The Tamal post office is a substation of the San Quentin post office.

In the state legislature, San Quentin is in the 3rd Senate District, and in the 6th Assembly District.

The village is served by Golden Gate Transit route 40 between Richmond and El Cerrito del Norte BART stations across the Richmond-San Rafael Bridge in Contra Costa County and San Rafael Transit Center in downtown San Rafael. The community is in ZIP code 94964 and area codes 415 and 628. Prior to the opening of the Richmond–San Rafael Bridge, the Richmond–San Rafael Ferry Company operated car ferries between here and Castro Point in Richmond.

Notable people
 Duster Mails, was a Major League Baseball pitcher for the Brooklyn Robins, Cleveland Indians and St. Louis Cardinals.

References

External links

Unincorporated communities in California
Unincorporated communities in Marin County, California
1859 establishments in California
Populated coastal places in California